Cromlix House is a Victorian mansion near Kinbuck, Perthshire. A house was built on the site in 1874 as a family residence in the time of Captain Arthur Drummond Hay, but was destroyed by fire in 1878. It was replaced in 1880 by the house which forms the nucleus of the present building, and was subsequently operated as a hotel. The hotel closed in 2011 and in early 2013 it was bought by tennis player Andy Murray. The hotel re-opened in April 2014 under the name Cromlix, managed by Inverlochy Castle Management International (ICMI).

History
There are records of Cromlix from the 1500s when the Bishop of Dunblane sold the lands of Cromlix to his brother, Robert Chisholm. The present house was built for Arthur Hay-Drummond, son of the Earl of Kinnoul. King Edward VII visited in September 1908. The house remained a family home for the Hay-Drummonds until the death of Evelyn Hay-Drummond in 1971, who had married Terence Eden (8th Lord Auckland).

Cromlix House was converted in May 1981 from what was the Eden family home, and retained much of the original furniture designed for the house as well as the family portraits. It also contains Cromlix Chapel, a consecrated Episcopalian Church in the diocese of Dunblane dating from 1874 which was opened by Charles Wordsworth, Bishop of St Andrews, Dunkeld and Dunblane. It contains some notable features, including the reredos, carved by Alexander MacDonald, a sculptor who lived in Rome, son of Lawrence MacDonald.

Between the 1980s and its closure on 16 February 2012 it was run as a four-star country house hotel, with 14 bedrooms including eight suites.

In 2006 Cromlix House – including the game larder, ancillary building, gatepiers and garden boundary walls – was designated as a Category C listed building. An obelisk sundial in the garden is Category A listed.

In October 2010 it served as the wedding venue for tennis player Jamie Murray and Colombian MBA student Alejandra Murray (née Gutierrez); his brother and fellow  player Andy was the best man.

Following a period of financial difficulties, staff phoned guests telling them their reservations would not be honoured and added a statement to the website that read: "We regret to inform you that as of 16th February 2012, Cromlix House Hotel ceased trading." The property had been listed for sale since August 2011.

In February 2013, it was confirmed that Andy Murray had bought the property for £1.8 million. It opened as a 15-room five-star hotel in April 2014.

In April 2015 Cromlix was the venue for the wedding reception of Andy Murray and his wife Kim, and the following year Murray's father and partner Sam Watson were married at the hotel.

References

External links

 Cromlix Luxury Hotel

Country houses in Stirling (council area)
Houses completed in 1874
Category C listed buildings in Stirling (council area)
Hotels in Perth and Kinross